The Science Innovation Award is an award bestowed annually by the European Association of Geochemistry on a scientist who has made "a particularly important and innovative breakthrough in geochemistry", and consists of a medal and certificate. The specific subject area of the award varies according to a five-year cycle:

Former recipients of the Science Innovation Award are, in reverse chronological order:

See also

 List of geology awards

References
Science Innovation Award Homepage

European science and technology awards
Geology awards